B. Shivadhar Reddy is a 1994-Batch Indian Police Service officer, from Ranga Reddy district of Telangana State. Battula Shivadhar Reddy has pursued his LL.B. from Osmania University, Hyderabad. B. Shivadhar Reddy is one of the toppers of Civil Service Examination, 1993. He is presently an Additional Director General of Police. Prior to this, B. Shivadhar Reddy sir has been incumbent of various positions at the district and state levels.

 
In the initial days of his service, he worked as ASP, and later he was the Superintendent of Police for various districts such as Nalgonda, Srikakulam, Guntur and Nellore. He has also had experience in working as a Deputy Commissioner of Police in Hyderabad. He worked as DIG at various top positions.

For quite some time, B. Shivadhar Reddy has also been posted as Director, Anti Corruption Bureau, AP. Later, he has become the youngest officer, by service, to have been appointed Commissioner of Police, Visakhapatnam city, Andhra Pradesh. He was awarded the 'President's Medal' twice  for his exceptional police service. Being one of the first picked All India Service officers post Telangana State formation, B. Shivadhar Reddy, IPS,  was instrumental in reforming the Telangana State Policing, and introducing the concept  'Friendly and Formidable Policing' in the newly formed state of Telangana. He is considered a no-nonsense officer that worshipped his service more than he did family. 

During his 26-year service as an IPS officer, Reddy ensured a plethora of new policies for responsible-responsive-policing. His experience at various levels has been transforming Telangana police from just a vigilance and law enforcing agency, to a people-friendly department.

References

 http://itcsa.blogspot.in/2013/02/indian-police-service-ips-civil-list-ap.html?m=1

Living people
Indian police officers
Year of birth missing (living people)
Osmania University alumni